

List of governors
This is a list of the governors of Meghalaya state in northeastern India. Meghalaya became an autonomous state within Assam on 1 April 1970 and a separate state on 21 January 1972.

See also
 Meghalaya
 Governors of India
 Chief Minister of Meghalaya

References

 States of India since 1947

External links
 Name of the Governors/Chief Ministers and Chain of Events in Meghalaya

 
Meghalaya
Governors